The 9th Space Division (9th SD) is an inactive United States Air Force organization. Its last assignment was with Air Force Space Command, being stationed at Patrick Air Force Base, Florida. It was inactivated on 1 October 1991.

History

Tactical Air Command
The organization has had several periods of activation over its lifetime. Initially established in April 1949 as the 9th Air Division (Tactical) under Fourteenth Air Force, Continental Air Command at Pope Air Force Base, North Carolina, the command had no units assigned but was to act as a headquarters over tactical units. It was inactivated in August 1950.

Air defense

It was redesignated 9th Air Division (Defense) and reactivated in October 1954 by Air Defense Command (ADC) and assigned to Western Air Defense Force (WADF) at Geiger Field, Washington, taking over control of air defense units in eastern Washington, Oregon and Idaho from the 25th Air Division (AD), after the 25th AD was realigned over the Washington and Oregon coastal area west of the Cascade Mountains.  It participated in the United States Air Force collateral mission of antisubmarine warfare and administered, equipped, and trained for combat.  It was inactivated in 1958 when the Spokane Air Defense Sector was established by ADC to take over its responsibilities.

Aerospace and missile defense
The third incarnation of the organization began in 1961 with its reactivation as the 9th Aerospace Defense Division was associated with the North American Aerospace Defense Command by ADC, assuming responsibility for the Ballistic Missile Early Warning System, the Missile Defense Alarm System, the Space Detection and Tracking System (SPADATS), the NORAD combat operations Center, the Bomb Alarm System, and the Nuclear Detonation System.

During the Cuban Missile Crisis, the 9th implemented an improvised missile warning system directed toward the Cuban missile threat called Falling Leaves.  In October 1962, the SPADATS AN/FPS-49 radar at Moorestown Air Force Station, New Jersey was reoriented south and directed toward Cuba.  A communication network was established with Moorestown, the AN/FPS-78 radar at Laredo Air Force Base, Texas and the AN/FPS-35 radar site at Thomasville Air Force Station, Alabama.  All three stations were in turn tied into the command centers at NORAD and at Strategic Air Command.  This missile detection network remained in operation until 28 November and the Moorestown and Laredo sites were returned to their normal SPADATS mission when Soviet missiles were withdrawn from Cuba.  The Thomasville station, retained coverage until late December as a precaution.

The division was inactivated in 1968 when its mission was elevated to a Numbered Air Force level, and transferred along with its personnel and equipment to the Fourteenth Aerospace Force on 1 July.

The most recent incarnation the 9th Space Division began in 1990 when Air Force Space Command (AFSPACECOM) reactivated the organization to provide an action mechanism to "operationalize" the space launch capabilities of Eastern Space and Missile Center (ESMC) and Western Space and Missile Center (WSMC) units transferred from Air Force Systems Command to AFSPACECOM during 1990–1991. ESMC and WSMC became respectively the 45th Space Wing and 30th Space Wing within two months of the Division's inactivation in 1991.

Lineage
 Constituted as the 9th Air Division (Tactical) on 7 April 1949
 Activated on 1 May 1949
 Inactivated on 1 August 1950
 Redesignated 9th Air Division (Defense) on 21 June 1954
 Activated on 8 October 1954
 Inactivated on 15 August 1958
 Redesignated 9th Aerospace Defense Division and activated on 14 July 1961 (not organized)
 Organized on 15 July 1961
 Discontinued and inactivated on 1 July 1968
 Redesignated 9th Space Division on 11 September 1990
 Activated on 1 October 1990
 Inactivated on 1 October 1991

Assignments
 Fourteenth Air Force, 1 May 1949 – 1 August 1950
 Western Air Defense Force, 8 October 1954 – 15 August 1958
 Air (later, Aerospace) Defense Command, 14 July 1961 – 1 July 1968
 Air Force Space Command, 1 October 1990 – 1 October 1991

Stations
 Pope Air Force Base, North Carolina, 1 May 1949 – 1 August 1950
 Geiger Field, Washington, 8 October 1954 – 15 August 1958
 Ent Air Force Base, Colorado, 15 July 1961 – 1 July 1968
 Patrick Air Force Base, Florida, 1 October 1990 – 1 October 1991.

Components

Centers
 Eastern Space and Missile Center: 1 October 1990 – 1 October 1991
 Patrick Air Force Base, Florida
 Western Space and Missile Center: 1 October 1990 – 1 October 1991
 Vandenberg Air Force Base, California

Wings
 71st Surveillance Wing (later 71 Missile Warning Wing): January 1962 – 1 July 1968
 Ent Air Force Base, Colorado
 73d Aerospace Surveillance Wing: 1 January 1967 – 1 July 1968.
 Ent Air Force Base, Colorado

Groups
 10th Aerospace Defense Group: 1 January 1967 – 1 July 1968
 Vandenburg Air Force Base, California
 84th Fighter Group (Air Defense), 18 August 1955 – 15 August 1958
 Geiger Field, Washington
 530th Air Defense Group: 18 February 1953 – 18 August 1955
 Geiger Field, Washington
 4721st Air Defense Group: 1 December 1956 – 15 August 1958.
 Larson Air Force Base, Washington

Squadrons

 1st Aerospace Surveillance and Control Squadron (later, l Aerospace Control Squadron): 1 October 1961 – 1 July 1968
 Ent Air Force Base, Colorado
 2d Surveillance Squadron: 1 February 1962 – 1 January 1967
 Ent Air Force Base, Colorado
 10 Aerospace Defense Squadron: 1 August 1964 – 1 January 1967
 Vandenberg Air Force Base, California
 31st Fighter-Interceptor Squadron: 8 October 1954 – 18 August 1955
 Larson Air Force Base, Washington
 322d Fighter-Interceptor Squadron: 18 August 1955 – 1 December 1956
 Larson Air Force Base, Washington
 323d Fighter-Interceptor Squadron: 8 October 1954 – 18 August 1955
 Larson Air Force Base, Washington
 538th Fighter-Interceptor Squadron: 18 August 1955 – 1 December 1956
 Larson Air Force Base, Washington
 4755th Ground Observer Squadron: 1 January 1955 – 25 March 1959
 Geiger Field, Washington

 634th Aircraft Control and Warning Squadron: 20 October 1954 – 15 August 1958
 McChord Air Force Base, Washington
 636th Aircraft Control and Warning Squadron: 8 October 1954 – 15 August 1958
 Condon Air Force Station, Oregon
 637th Aircraft Control and Warning Squadron: 8 October 1954 – 15 August 1958
 Othello Air Force Station, Washington
 638th Aircraft Control and Warning Squadron: 8 October 1954 – 15 August 1958
 Curlew Air Force Station, Washington
 760th Aircraft Control and Warning Squadron: 8 October 1954 – 15 August 1958
 Colville Air Force Station, Washington
 821st Aircraft Control and Warning Squadron: 8 September 1957 – 15 August 1958
 Baker Air Force Station, Oregon
 822d Aircraft Control and Warning Squadron: 8 September 1956 – 15 August 1958
 Cottonwood Air Force Station, Idaho
 823d Aircraft Control and Warning Squadron: 8 April 1955 – 15 August 1958
 Mica Peak Air Force Station, Washington

See also
 List of United States Air Force air divisions
 List of USAF Aerospace Defense Command General Surveillance Radar Stations
 Aerospace Defense Command Fighter Squadrons
 List of United States Air Force aircraft control and warning squadrons

References

Notes

Bibliography

 NORAD/CONAD Participation in the Cuban Missile Crisis, Historical Reference Paper No. 8, Directorate of Command History Continental Air Defense Command, Ent AFB, CO, 1 Feb 63 (Top Secret NOFORN declassified 9 March 1996

Further reading
 
 
 
 
 "ADCOM's Fighter Interceptor Squadrons". The Interceptor (January 1979) Aerospace Defense Command, (Volume 21, Number 1).

External links
 Air Force Historical Research Agency: 9th Space Division

Air 0009
Divisions of the United States Air Force
Military units and formations established in 1990
Military units and formations disestablished in 1991